Kosmos 2474 ( meaning Cosmos 2474) is a  Russian military satellite launched in 2011 as part of the GLONASS satellite navigation system.

This satellite is a GLONASS-M satellite, also known as Uragan-M, and is numbered Uragan-M No. 742.

Kosmos 2474 was launched from Site 43/4  at Plesetsk Cosmodrome in northern Russia. A Soyuz-2-1b carrier rocket with a Fregat upper stage was used to perform the launch which took place at 20:15 UTC on 2 October 2011. The launch successfully placed the satellite into Medium Earth orbit. It subsequently received its Kosmos designation, and the international designator 2011-055A. The United States Space Command assigned them the Satellite Catalog Numbers 37829.

It was due to be launched on 25 August 2011 but was postponed due to the failed launch of Progress M-12M the day before. It was rescheduled to 25 September, and then to 1 October before being launched on 2 October.

It is in the first orbital plane used by GLONASS, in orbital slot 4.

See also

List of Kosmos satellites (2251–2500)
List of R-7 launches (2010–2014)

References

Spacecraft launched in 2011
Spacecraft launched by Soyuz-2 rockets
Kosmos satellites